Schistura callidora is a species of ray-finned fish in the stone loach genus Schistura. It was first found in the Myitnge River drainage, Irrawaddy basin in Myanmar. It is distinguished by possessing dark bars on its body, being much thinner in its anterior half; a high dorsal crest on the caudal peduncle; the number of dorsal-fin rays; and its lateral line which reaches behind the base of the anal fin.

References

Further reading
Lokeshwor, Yumnam, and Waikhom Vishwanath. "Schistura porocephala, a new nemacheilid loach from Koladyne basin, Mizoram, India (Teleostei: Nemacheilidae)." Ichthyological research 60.2 (2013): 159–164.
Bohlen, Jörg, Vendula Šlechtová, and Kamphol Udomritthiruj. "Schistura hypsiura, a new species of loach (Cobitoidea: Nemacheilidae) from South-West Myanmar." Raffles Bulletin of Zoology 62 (2014): 21–27.

External links 
 

callidora
Fish described in 2011
Fish of Myanmar